Cattleya sanguiloba (the "bloody-lipped Cattleya"), also known by the synonym Laelia sanguiloba.

It is a species of orchid endemic to the state Bahia located in southeastern Brazil.

It is native to the Atlantic Forest biome (Mata Atlantica Brasileira) habitats there.

References

External links 

sanguiloba
Endemic orchids of Brazil
Orchids of Bahia
Flora of the Atlantic Forest